Psychotria tahitensis is a species of plant in the family Rubiaceae. It is endemic to French Polynesia.

References

tahitensis
Flora of French Polynesia
Psychotria tahitensis
Critically endangered flora of Oceania
Taxonomy articles created by Polbot